Karīna Cvečkovska (born 3 December 1984) is a Latvian footballer who plays as a midfielder. She has been a member of the Latvia women's national team.

References

1984 births
Living people
Women's association football midfielders
Latvian women's footballers
Latvia women's international footballers
FK Liepājas Metalurgs (women) players